SGN can refer to:

 SGN (company), a gas distribution company operating in Scotland and southern England
 The airport code for Tan Son Nhat International Airport, Ho Chi Minh City, Vietnam
 The National Rail station code for South Greenford railway station, London, England
 Sélection de Grains Nobles, a French term for sweet wines made from grapes affected by noble rot
 Some Good News, a YouTube series
 Samsung Galaxy Note, a series of mobile phones
 Seattle Gay News, owner of the sgn.org domain

In mathematics 

 , the sign function 
 , the signature of a permutation